OHiggins was a Chilean armoured cruiser. OHiggins was built by the British shipbuilder Armstrong to the design of Philip Watts, and served with the Chilean Navy between 1898 and 1933.

Construction
In April 1896, the Chilean government ordered an armoured cruiser, to be called OHiggins, from Armstrong, Whitworth & Co to the design of Sir Philip Watts at a cost of £700,000. The ship was laid down at Armstrong's Elswick, Newcastle-on-Tyne shipyard on 4 April 1896, launched on 17 May 1897 and completed on 2 April 1898.

Design

OHiggins main armament consisted of four  40 calibre guns in single turrets, with two on the ship's centreline fore and aft and two port and starboard in line with the forward funnel. Ten  40 calibre guns were fitted, with six in casemates and the remaining four in single turrets. Four  guns, ten 12-pounder guns and ten 6-pounder guns completed OHigginss gun armament. All guns were designed and built by Armstrongs. Three  torpedo tubes were fitted, with two submerged tubes on the ship's beam and one above the waterline right aft.

The ship's hull was clad in copper and wood to reduce fouling.

The ship was powered by two vertical triple-expansion steam engines, supplied by 30 Belleville water-tube boilers, driving two shafts.

Operational history
While OHiggins was nearing completion at Elswick in the winter of 1897, tensions were growing between Spain and the United States of America over the ongoing rebellion in Cuba. Rumours circulated that Spain was trying to strengthen its navy in case of war with the United States by purchasing warships from other countries. The rumoured targets for Spain included OHiggins, the newly completed Chilean armoured cruiser  and the protected cruiser  also nearing completion for Chile at Elswicks. As the outbreak of the Spanish–American War became more likely, the United States also attempted to supplement its fleet by purchasing, amongst other ships, OHiggins, but the negotiations did not result in the sale of the Chilean warship, and OHiggins arrived at Valparaiso on 25 July 1898.

The ship hosted a meeting between the President of Chile, Federico Errázuriz Echaurren and the Argentine President Julio Argentino Roca at Punta Arenas on 15 February 1899, to normalise relations between the two countries. This meeting became known as the "Embrace of the Straits" (El Abrazo del Estrecho). The ship was sent to Panama in 1903 as a result of the confrontation between the United States and Columbia that was ended by the separation of Panama from Colombia.

In 1919, OHiggins was fitted with a floatplane that could be lowered to and from the sea for operations by crane. On 12 March 1920, OHiggins collided with the Chilean cargo ship SS Llai Llai at Philadelphia, Pennsylvania; Llai Llai sank. An aircraft crashed into OHiggins on 24 August 1920, killing the pilot. The ship was refitted twice, in 1919–1920 and 1928–29.

In 1931, OHiggins was involved in the large scale mutiny that swept the Chilean fleet, being seized by its crew on 1 September 1931.

OHiggins was decommissioned in 1933 and scrapped in 1958.

See also
 List of decommissioned ships of the Chilean Navy

Notes and references
Notes

Citations

Bibliography
 Brooke, Peter. Warships for Export: Armstrong Warships 1867–1927. Gravesend, UK: World Ship Society, 1999. .
Chesneau, Roger and Eugene M. Kolesnik. Conway's All the World's Fighting Ships 1860–1905. London: Conway's Maritime Press, 1979. .
Whitley, M.J. Cruisers of World War Two: An International Encyclopedia. London: Brockhamton Press, 1999. .

External links

Cruisers of the Chilean Navy
Ships built by Armstrong Whitworth
1897 ships
Maritime incidents in 1920